Rudolph Lexow (January 10, 1823 Tönning, Schleswig-Holstein – July 16, 1909 New York City) was a German-American writer and editor.

Biography
Lexow graduated from the University of Kiel and was active in the Revolutions of 1848 in Germany.  He fled to England, where he married Caroline King in Hull, and then traveled on to the United States, where he settled in New York City and founded the Belletristisches Journal in 1852.

Family
Rudolph and Caroline Lexow were the parents of New York City attorney Charles King Lexow, New York state senator Clarence Lexow, Allan Lexow and Rudolph G. Lexow. Their granddaughter Caroline Lexow Babcock was a prominent suffragist and pacifist.

Works
He wrote histories of the American Civil War and of the Revolutions of 1848 in Germany.

References

External links
 
 

1823 births
1909 deaths
German emigrants to the United States
American editors
German-American Forty-Eighters
People from the Duchy of Schleswig
University of Kiel alumni